Karan Malhotra is an Indian film director and screenwriter.  He is best known for his debut film Agneepath (2012) which emerged as one of the highest grossing Bollywood film of the year. Before marking his directorial debut with Dharma Productions, he has worked for ten years as an assistant director in the Hindi film industry.

Career
Malhotra worked as an assistant director in the films such as Jodhaa Akbar, My Name Is Khan and Jaan-E-Mann before co-writing and directing Agneepath, a remake of the 1990 cult classic of the same name.

Karan Malhotra has also directed the film Brothers in 2015, an official remake of the 2011 American film Warrior starring Akshay Kumar, Sidharth Malhotra, Jacqueline Fernandez and Jackie Shroff.

Malhotra and his wife Ekta Pathak Malhotra began collaborating on the screenplay for Shuddhi which was slated for a Diwali 2016 release for Dharma Productions. Whilst working on the script both made several research-based trips to Hrishikesh, one of the prominent shooting locations for the film. In March 2013, producer Karan Johar officially announced that Dharma Productions had begun pre-production on a new film venture titled Shuddhi.

Though initially rumoured that Malhotra's Shuddhi would be the film adaptation of Amish Tripathi's "The Immortals of Meluha", it was later proven false. In September 2013, Karan Johar announced that Malhotra would  be directing The Immortals of Meluha, but only after the theatrical release of Shuddhi. However, in May 2017, Amish Tripathi revealed that Dharma Productions had dropped the film rights to his books due to the contract expiring, with filmmaker Sanjay Leela Bhansali now holding them.

In May 2018, Yash Raj Films announced that Malhotra would next be directing the period action-adventure film Shamshera, set to release in 2022.

Filmography

As Assistant Director

References

External links

Film directors from Mumbai
Living people
Year of birth missing (living people)